RMS or SS Empress of India may refer to one of these Canadian Pacific Steamship Company ocean liners:

 , a  ship that served Canadian Pacific until 1914; later named Loyalty; scrapped 1929
 , originally the  North German Lloyd ship SS Prinz Friedrich Wilhelm launched in 1907; briefly named Empress of China in 1921; renamed Empress of India; later renamed Montlaurier,  Monteith, and Montnairn before being scrapped in 1929.

See also
 Empress of India

Ship names